Mary Kathryn "Katie" Haltiwanger Schmitz is an American exercise physiologist. She is the Associate Director of Population Sciences at Penn State University College of Medicine and a Full Professor at the Perelman School of Medicine at the University of Pennsylvania.

Early life and education
Growing up in New York, Schmitz was a dancer with the Martha Graham Dance Ensemble and a personal trainer and manager of the Salomon Brothers executive fitness center. While working at the fitness center, Schmitz realized she was often unable to answer clients questions due to a lack of knowledge. As a result, Schmitz decided to earn a master's degree in exercise science from Queens College, City University of New York and an MPH and doctorate in exercise physiology from the University of Minnesota.

Career
Upon receiving her PhD, Schmitz joined the University of Minnesota's School of Public Health faculty before accepting a position at the University of Pennsylvania (UPenn). She later recalled that she chose to switch institutions because of UPenn's "strong exercise physiology program." While at the University of Minnesota, Schmitz conducted a small scale study on women with or without lymphedema and strength training. The results found that lymphedema symptoms go better in women who did strength training, as well as improved their strength, body fat percentage, and their quality of life. As an assistant professor of epidemiology at the Penn State University College of Medicine, Schmitz's research focused on understanding the connection between physical activity and diseases. In 2006, she launched a study on the effectiveness of YMCA memberships combined with supervised strength training classes on overweight and obese women. Her research began to gain more attraction when she published her randomized trial of weight lifting for breast cancer survivors.

As an associate professor in the department of biostatistics and epidemiology, Schmitz established the SHE study (for Strong, Healthy and Empowered), to prove that resistance exercise significantly slowed middle-age weight gain. By June, she was appointed the lead author of the first American College of Sports Medicine Roundtable on Exercise for Cancer Survivors, which published guidance for exercise testing and prescription for cancer survivors. Formally, upper body exercises were discouraged for survivors, but Schmitz's research suggested that patients avoid inactivity both during and after cancer treatment. She later co-published a randomized trial study which was aimed at determining the benefits breast cancer survivors without lymphedema could enjoy through weightlifting. Her research team compared the results one year of weight lifting intervention could have on survivors at risk for breast cancer–related lymphedema. Her research was recognized by the National Lymphedema Network with the awarding of the Catalyst Award for "being a researcher whose work has stimulated thought, discussion, and debate that leads to improvement in patient care for those with lymphedema."

In 2011, the National Cancer Institute granted the Perelman School of Medicine a $10 million grant to establish a new center focusing on the relationship between exercise, weight loss, and improving the length and quality of life. Schmitz was appointed the leader of one trial in the center which focused on examining the relationship between lymphedema and weight loss in overweight breast cancer survivors. She later transferred her Transdisciplinary Research on Energetics and Cancer (TREC) Center grant to the Penn State Cancer Institute and became the associate director of population sciences. In 2017, Schmitz became the president-elect of the American College of Sports Medicine and was nominated for UPenn's Innovator of the Year Award. In her role as associate director, Schmitz co-developed updated guidelines and exercise recommendations for people living with cancer or survivors of the disease.

References

External links
 

Living people
University of Minnesota alumni
University of North Carolina alumni
Queens College, City University of New York alumni
University of Minnesota faculty
Perelman School of Medicine at the University of Pennsylvania faculty
American female dancers
Year of birth missing (living people)
American women academics
21st-century American women